Samuel McNab (20 October 1926 – 2 November 1995) was a Scottish professional footballer who played as an inside forward in the Football League for Sheffield United and York City, in non-League football for Cheltenham Town, in the Scottish Football League for Hamilton Academical, and in Scottish junior football for Dalry Thistle.

References

1926 births
Footballers from Glasgow
1995 deaths
Scottish footballers
Association football inside forwards
Dalry Thistle F.C. players
Sheffield United F.C. players
York City F.C. players
Cheltenham Town F.C. players
Hamilton Academical F.C. players
English Football League players
Scottish Football League players
Scottish Junior Football Association players